The C. A. Lawton Company building, now called the Historic Lawton Foundry, is located in De Pere, Wisconsin.

History
The building originally housed the general machining business Novelty Mfg. Co., which was owned by Charles A. Lawton and his uncle, E. W. Arndt. Lawton's descendants operated the business into the 1970s. The building has since been converted into apartments. It was added to the State Register Historic Places in 1991 and to the National Register of Historic Places the following year.

References

External links 
 Town Homes web site

Industrial buildings and structures on the National Register of Historic Places in Wisconsin
Residential buildings on the National Register of Historic Places in Wisconsin
National Register of Historic Places in Brown County, Wisconsin
Italianate architecture in Wisconsin
Brick buildings and structures
Industrial buildings completed in 1879
Apartment buildings in Wisconsin
Buildings and structures completed in 1879
1879 establishments in Wisconsin